Chaka Khan is the fourth solo album by American R&B/funk singer Chaka Khan, released on the Warner Bros. Records label in 1982.

Overview 

Two singles were released from Chaka Khan: the Michael Jackson cover "Got to Be There" (US Pop #67, US R&B #5) and "Tearin' It Up" (US R&B #48), the latter also as a 12" single including an extended remix (7:21) as well as an instrumental version (8:07), both mixed by Larry Levan and included on Warner Music Japan's 1999 compilation Dance Classics of Chaka Khan. The album track "Slow Dancin'" was a funky ballad duet with Rick James. On Billboard's charts, the album reached #5 on Black Albums and #52 on Pop Albums. The "Be Bop Medley" won producer Arif Mardin and Khan a Grammy Award in 1984 in the Best Vocal Arrangement For Two Or More Voices category.

Following the release of the Chaka Khan album and the greatest hits package The Very Best of Rufus featuring Chaka Khan, Khan reunited with the band Rufus later that year for one final album together, the double live/studio set Stompin' at the Savoy - Live (1983). Her next solo album I Feel for You followed in 1984.

Despite its many accolades and artistic achievements the Chaka Khan album remained unreleased on CD in both the United States and Europe, and was only available as an import from Japan, until it was finally issued on CD in the UK in 2010 as part of a Five disc set containing Khan's first five solo albums.

Track listing

Personnel 
 Chaka Khan - Vocals, Backing vocals
 Steve Ferrone – drums on all tracks
 Will Lee - bass tracks: 2, 5, 6, 8
 Paul Jackson Jr. - electric guitar tracks: 1, 2, 3, 4
 Hiram Bullock - guitar tracks: 5, 7, 8, rhythm guitar track: 6

Track 1 “ Tearin’ It Up”
Low Voice - Alvin Fields
Vocal Ad Libs - Hamish Stuart
Electric Piano - Lenny Underwood
Moog bass synthesizer, Prophet and Jupiter synthesizers - Robbie Buchanan
Handclaps - Steve Ferrone
Percussion - Sammy Figueroa
Alto Saxophone Solo - Michael Brecker

Track 2 “Slow Dancin’”
Vocal - Rick James
Keyboards & Synthesizers - Robbie Buchanan

Track 3 “ Best In The West”
Keyboards & Synthesizers - Robbie Buchanan
Additional OBX Synthesizer - Bob Christianson
Percussion - Sammy Figueroa
Fiddle - Kenny Kosek
Harmonica - Robert Bonfiglio
Steel guitar & Jaw Harp - Eric Weissberg

Track 4 “Got To Be There”
Keyboards & Synthesizers - Robbie Buchanan
Background vocals – Hamish Stuart, Will Lee

Track 5 “Be Bop Medley”
Additional OBX Synthesizer - Bob Christianson
Electric piano & Synthesizers – Robbie Buchanan
Vocoder & additional synthesizers ("Con Alma") – Bob Christianson
Sitar - Eric Weissberg
Darbuka ("East Of Suez") - Seyhun Çelik
Tenor Saxophone - Joe Henderson

Track 6 “Twisted”
Lead Guitar - Ray Gomez
Keyboards & Synthesizers - Robbie Buchanan

Track 7 “So Not To Worry”
Bass - Anthony Jackson
Piano & Synthesizers – Robbie Buchanan
Background vocals – Hamish Stuart, Will Lee

Track 8 “Pass It On (A Sure Thing) (Pasa Lo Esta Seguro)”
Tube Voice – Mark Stevens
Piano & Synthesizers – Robbie Buchanan
Alto Saxophone - Dave Tofani

Production 
 Arif Mardin - record producer, musical arranger (rhythm) tracks: 1, 2, 3, musical arranger track: 4, musical arranger & vocal arrangement track: 5
 Randy Brecker - musical arranger (horns) track: 1
 Robbie Buchanan - musical arranger (bass part) track: 1, musical arranger (rhythm) tracks: 2, 3, 6, 7, 8. musical arranger tracks: 4, 5
 Danne Lemelle - musical arranger (horns) track: 2
 Chaka Khan - vocal arrangement & special lyrics track: 5

References

External links
Chaka Khan at Discogs

1982 albums
Chaka Khan albums
Albums produced by Arif Mardin
Warner Records albums